Houghton County is a county in the Upper Peninsula in the U.S. state of Michigan. As of the 2020 Census, the population was 37,361. The county seat and largest city is Houghton. Both the county and the city were named for Michigan State geologist and Detroit Mayor Douglass Houghton.

Houghton County is part of the Houghton Micropolitan Statistical Area, which also includes Keweenaw County, and was part of Copper Country during the mining boom of the latter half of the 19th century and the early part of the 20th century.

Geography

The Portage Lift Bridge crosses Portage Lake, connecting Hancock and Houghton, Michigan, by crossing over Portage Lake, which is part of the river and canal system that spans the peninsula. The Portage Lift Bridge is the world's heaviest and widest double-decked vertical lift bridge. Its center span "lifts" to provide  of clearance for ships. Since rail traffic was discontinued in the Keweenaw, the lower deck accommodates snowmobile traffic in the winter. This is the only land-based link between the Keweenaw Peninsula's north and south sections, making it crucial to local transportation.

Major highways
  runs from the southeast corner of the county, north and northwest to Chassell and Houghton, then northeast to Copper Harbor.
  enters the western portion of county from Mass City and runs northeast through South Range and Houghton to intersect with US 41 at Keweenaw Park.
  runs east–west across lower portion of county, past Kenton and Sidnaw.
  runs east–west across center of county, past White, Nisula, and Alston.
  runs northwest from Houghton, then loops northeast and east to intersect with US 41.

Airport
 Prickett-Grooms Field  privately owned public-use general-aviation daytime-access airport at Sidnaw (since 1940s).
 Houghton County Memorial Airport (KCMX) between Hancock and Calumet (since 1948). General-aviation and limited commercial airline service.

Adjacent counties
 Keweenaw County, north
 Baraga County, east
 Iron County, south border (on Central Time Zone)
 Ontonagon County, west

National protected areas
 Keweenaw National Historical Park (part)
 Ottawa National Forest (part)

Climate

Demographics

The 2010 United States Census indicates Houghton County had a population of 36,628. This is an increase of 612 people from 2000, a growth of 1.7%. In 2010 there were 14,232 households and 8,093 families in the county. There were 18,635 housing units at an average density of 18 per square mile (7/km2). 94.5% of the population were White, 2.9% Asian, 0.6% Native American, 0.5% Black or African American, 0.2% of some other race and 1.3% of two or more races. 1.1% were Hispanic or Latino (of any race). 32.5% were of Finnish, 14.0% German, 9.4% French, 6.2% English and 5.1% Irish ancestry.

There were 14,232 households, out of which 23.4% had children under the age of 18 living with them, 45% were married couples living together, 7.7% had a female householder with no husband present, and 43.1% were non-families. 32.2% of all households were made up of individuals, and 12.6% had someone living alone who was 65 years of age or older. The average household size was 2.38 and the average family size was 3.01.

The county population contained 20.6% under the age of 18, 20.6% from 18 to 24, 20.3% from 25 to 44, 23.6% from 45 to 64, and 15% who were 65 years of age or older. The median age was 33.1 years. The population was 45.9% female and 54.1% male.

The median income for a household in the county was $34,625, and the median income for a family was $48,506. The per capita income for the county was $18,556. About 12.6% of families and 22.8% of the population were below the poverty line, including 21.7% of people under the age of 18 and 9.2% of those age 65 or over.

History
In 1843, the Upper Peninsula was divided into Mackinac, Chippewa, Marquette, Schoolcraft, Delta, and Ontonagon Counties. In 1845, Houghton County boundaries were defined, with areas partitioned from Marquette and Ontonagon Counties. The new county was named after Douglass Houghton, the new state's first State Geologist, who extensively explored the Upper Peninsula's mineralogy. The original boundaries of Houghton County included the future Keweenaw and Baraga Counties. In 1846, the county was organized into three townships: Eagle Harbor, Houghton, and L'Anse. Keweenaw County was set off from Houghton County in 1861 and Baraga County was set off in 1875.

Houghton County's history is heavily marked by immigration. At one of the peaks of its population, the 1910 census had 40.6% of its population of 88,098 as foreign-born, with 89.3% of the population being either foreign-born or having at one or both of their parents as foreign-born. 70.6% of all voters were foreign-born, and only 5.1% of voters were native-born with native parents. This amalgam of immigrants from dozens of countries created a unique culture, especially once population growth stopped, and the county shrank in population to its current numbers. Heavily representative among many ethnicities were the Finnish. The 1910 census listed 13.1% of the residents being Finnish-born (out of the 32.3% total of the residents listed as foreign-born). The 2010 census lists almost the same proportion (32.5%) of the population as having Finnish ancestors.

Amid the Great Depression of the 1930s, a sharp increase in unemployment among workers in the mining and timber industries caused a pivot to potato production. For a brief time in the 1930s and 1940s, the region became a major exporter of potatoes within the United States.

In June 2018, a major flash flood caused sinkholes and washouts in the towns of Chassell, Houghton, Ripley, Lake Linden, and Hubbell.

Government
Houghton County voters tend to favor Republican Party nominees. Since 1884, the Republican Party has been selected in 76% (26 of 34) of national elections.

The county government operates the jail, maintains rural roads, operates the major local courts, records deeds, mortgages, and vital records, administers public health regulations, and participates with the state in the provision of social services. The county board of commissioners controls the budget and has limited authority to make laws or ordinances. In Michigan, most local government functions—police and fire, building and zoning, tax assessment, street maintenance, etc.—are the responsibility of individual cities and townships.

The Houghton County Courthouse "..stood high upon the bluff on Houghton Village facing North and pleasantly overlooking Portage Lake.", and has been inducted in the US Registry of Historic Districts and Buildings of the Upper Peninsula. Construction began in spring 1886. The building had its first addition to the north wing, the addition of a larger jail wing, in 1910, and that was the only renovation until the jail wing was condemned in 1961. A new jail was built in its present location, adjacent to the original. According to the Mining Gazette, "The materials used with the exception of the facing brick are the product of the Upper Peninsula" (July 25, 1886, p. 3). Kathryn Eckert, in her Buildings of Michigan, wrote:
"The courthouse is composed of the original structure, a rectangular block from which project central pavilions with parapeted dormers, a four-story tower, and north and west wing additions. The curbed mansard roof, the grouping of windows beneath red sandstone lintels connected by bands that encircle the structure, and the decorative entablature unite the composition. Porches supported with posts and Gothic-arch brackets...The interior is richly finished with wood; red, rich brown, and light yellowish brown floor tiles; ornamental plaster; and oak staircase; and stone fireplaces." (p. 464)
The building section that was once the jail wing is now used for office space.

Elected officials

 Prosecuting Attorney: Michael E. Makinen
 Sheriff: Josh Saaranen (from 2021)
 County Clerk/Register of Deeds: Jennifer Lorenz
 County Treasurer: Kathleen A. Beattie
 Drain Commissioner: John Pekkala
 Mine Inspector: Murray Giles

(information as of Sept 2018)

Communities

Cities
 Hancock
 Houghton (county seat)

Villages
 Calumet
 Copper City
 Lake Linden
 Laurium
 South Range

Charter townships
 Calumet Charter Township
 Portage Charter Township

Civil townships

 Adams Township
 Chassell Township
 Duncan Township
 Elm River Township
 Franklin Township
 Hancock Township
 Laird Township
 Osceola Township
 Quincy Township
 Schoolcraft Township
 Stanton Township
 Torch Lake Township

Census-designated places
 Atlantic Mine
 Chassell
 Dodgeville
 Dollar Bay
 Hubbell
 Hurontown
 Painesdale
 Trimountain

Other unincorporated communities

 Blue Jacket
 Centennial
 Dakota Heights
 Donken
 Dreamland
 Franklin Mine
 Freda
 Jacobsville
 Kearsarge
 Mason
 Redridge
 Ripley
 Senter
 Tamarack City
 Toivola
 Twin Lakes
 White City
 Yellow Jacket

See also
 List of Michigan State Historic Sites in Houghton County, Michigan
 National Register of Historic Places listings in Houghton County, Michigan
 Robert T. Brown Nature Sanctuary

References

External links
 HoughtonCounty website
 Houghton County Sheriff's Office
 Houghton County Profile, Sam M Cohodas Regional Economist, Tawni Hunt Ferrarini, Ph.D.
 Township Locator Map
 Western Upper Peninsula Planning & Development Region

 
Michigan counties
1846 establishments in Michigan
Populated places established in 1846